Brownstown Township is one of twelve townships in Jackson County, Indiana, United States. At the 2010 census, its population was 5,552 and it contained 2,308 housing units.

History
Brownstown Township was organized in 1817, and took its name from Brownstown, the county seat. Shields' Mill Covered Bridge was listed on the National Register of Historic Places in 2016.

Geography
The streams of Ballard Creek, Hough Creek, Kiper Creek, Spray Creek, West Branch White Creek and White Creek run through this township.

Cities and towns
 Brownstown (the county seat)

Unincorporated towns
 Ewing
 New Elizabethtown
 Wegan

Adjacent townships
 Hamilton Township (northeast)
 Jackson Township (east)
 Washington Township (east)
 Grassy Fork Township (southeast)
 Carr Township (southwest)
 Driftwood Township (southwest)
 Owen Township (west)
 Pershing Township (northwest)

Cemeteries
The township contains ten cemeteries: Burrell, Durland, First German Presbyterian, Miller, Robertson, Saint Pauls, Smallwood, Wayman, Weathers and Woodmansee.

Major highways
  U.S. Route 50
  State Road 39
  State Road 135
  State Road 250

Education
Brownstown Township residents may obtain a free library card from the Brownstown Public Library in Downtown Brownstown.

References
 
 United States Census Bureau cartographic boundary files

External links
 Indiana Township Association
 United Township Association of Indiana

Townships in Jackson County, Indiana
Townships in Indiana